Calgary-Klein is a provincial electoral district in Calgary, Alberta, Canada. The district was created in the 2010 boundary redistribution and is mandated to return a single member to the Legislative Assembly of Alberta using the first past the post voting system. The riding is named after former premier Ralph Klein.

History
The electoral district was created in the 2010 Alberta boundary re-distribution. It was created mainly from Calgary-North Hill and a portion of Calgary-Nose Hill.

Boundary history

Electoral history

Prior to the election of New Democrat candidate Craig Coolahan in 2015, the antecedent electoral districts that comprise Calgary-Klein elected Progressive Conservative candidates since the 1970s.

Legislature results

2012 general election

2015 general election

2019 general election

Senate nominee results

2012 Senate nominee election district results

References

External links
Elections Alberta

Alberta provincial electoral districts
Politics of Calgary